Chairmen of the National Assembly of Czechoslovakia

Chairman of the Provisional National Assembly

Chairman of the Constituent National Assembly

Chairmen of the National Assembly

Sources

Czechoslovakia, National Assembly